Drones is a 2013 American thriller film directed by Rick Rosenthal and starring Eloise Mumford and Matt O'Leary.

Plot
Two Airmen are tasked with deciding the fate of a terrorist with a single push of a button. As the action plays out in real time, their window to use a deadly military drone on the target slowly closes. With time running out, the Airmen begin to question what the real motives are behind the ordered lethal attack.

Cast
Eloise Mumford as Susan "Sue" Lawson
Matt O'Leary as Jack Bowles
Whip Hubley as Colonel Wallace
William Russ as General Lawson
Amir Khalighi as Mahmoud Khalil

Reviews 

 On Rotten Tomatoes it got 33% on Tomatometer and 29% Audience Rating. 
 On Vudu it got 3 out of 5 stars.

See also 

 List of films featuring drones

References

External links 
 Official Website from archive.org
 
 

2013 films
American thriller films
Drone films
Films directed by Rick Rosenthal
2010s English-language films
2010s American films